This is chronological list of action films originally released in the 2020s. Often there may be considerable overlap particularly between action and other genres (including, horror, comedy, and science fiction films); the list should attempt to document films which are more closely related to action, even if they bend genres.

2020

2021

2022

2023

2024

Forthcoming

See also
 Action films
 Martial arts films
 Superhero films
 War films

References

Action
2020s